Margarites helicinus, common name the helicina margarite or spiral margarite, is a species of sea snail, a marine gastropod mollusk in the family Margaritidae.

Margarites helicinus has been established by Phipps in 1774 and not by Fabricus in 1780 as Winchworth (1932), Sneli (1970) (and others) mention.

Dall established in 1919 two varieties, but both have become synonyms of Margarites helicinus.
 Margarites helicinus var. elevatus Dall, 1919
 Margarites helicinus var. excavatus Dall, 1919

Description
The size of the shell varies between 3. mm and 11 mm.
The umbilicate, thin shell has a depressed-conoidal shape. It is flesh-colored, with paler at periphery and below the suture, fading into corneous around the umbilicus. The surface is very bright, shining, polished, and smooth except for fine subobsolete concentric lines around the umbilicus. The spire is conoidal. The apex is minute but obtuse. The suture is impressed. The shell contains about 5 convex whorls, the last very rapidly widening, somewhat descending toward the aperture. The rounded aperture is oblique, angular above, nacreous inside. The pearly iridescence is often visible through the shell. The narrow umbilicus is profound. Its opening is regularly curved, not separated from the base by a carina.

Distribution
This marine species occurs near the seashore in circum-arctic waters, in the North Atlantic, in European waters; from the Bering Strait to California, USA; in the Sea of Okhotsk.

Spawning and development
Spawning takes place during the spring in the San Juan Islands, WA, USA.  Prior to spawning two to four snails move close together, one of these is a female and all others are male.  A female release eggs only when in close proximity to a male.  Eggs are released in a mucus strand 2–3 eggs wide.  Eggs are orange to pinkish red, 180–200 µm in diameter, and each egg is covered by a gelatinous layer 10–30 µm thick.  Sperm release is not visible during spawning but must occur since eggs in newly produced egg masses are fertilized.  The female uses the leading edge of her foot to form the mucus strand into a globular egg mass 0.5–1.5 cm in diameter.  Each egg masses contains 90–1000 eggs, and egg masses are anchored to algal surfaces at both ends of the egg mass.

All embryonic and larval development takes place in the egg mass and young emerge as juvenile snails. Development proceeds as eggs undergo spiral cleavage.  Timing of development at 7–9 °C proceeds as embryos reached the gastrula stage 1.3 days after fertilization, the trochophore stage 2.1 days after fertilization, the veliger stage 3.3 days after fertilization, torsion between 4.5–5 days after fertilization, metamorphosis at 10.5 days, and hatched and crawled out of the egg mass as a juvenile snail at 12.1 days.

Shells of newly emergent juvenile snails are 270–300 µm long.

References

 Phipps, C. J. 1774. A Voyage towards the North Pole.  viii + 253 pp., 12 pls. J. Nourse: London. 
 Gmelin, J. F. 1791. Systema naturae per regna tria naturae. Editio decima tertia. Systema Naturae, 13th ed., vol. 1(6): 3021–3910. Lipsiae. 
 Montagu, G. 1808. Supplement to Testacea Britannica.  [iii] + v + 184 pp., 30 pls. S. Woolmer: Exeter.
 Leach, W. E. 1819. A list of invertebrate animals, discovered by his majesty's ship Isabella, in a voyage to the Arctic regions. A Voyage of Discovery. Appendix II, Zoological Memoranda lxi–lxiv John Murray: London.
 Totten, J. G. 1834. Description of some new shells, belonging to the coast of New England. American Journal of Science and Arts 26: 366–369, 1 pl. 
 Sowerby, G. B., I. 1838. A descriptive catalogue of the species of Leach's genus Margarita. Malacological and Conchological Magazine 1: 23–27.
 Thompson, W. 1844. Report on the fauna of Ireland: Div. Invertebrata. Report of the Thirteenth meeting of the British Association for the Advancement of Science 245–291.
 Middendorff, A. T. von. 1848. Vorläufige Anzeige einiger neuer Konchylien aus den Geschlectern: Littorina, Tritonium, Bullia, Natica und Margarita. Bulletin de la Classe Physico-Mathématique de l'Académie Impériale des Sciences de Saint-Pétersbourg 7: col. 241–245
 Middendorff, A. T. von. 1849. Beiträge zu einer Malacozoologia Rossica. II. Aufzählung und Beschreibung der zur Meeresfauna Russlands gehörigen einschaler. Mémoires de l'Académie Impériale des Sciences de Saint-Pétersbourg, Sciences Naturelles (6)6: 329–516, pls. 1–11. 
 Jeffreys, J. G. 1865. British conchology. British Conchology 3: [ii] + 393 pp., frontispiece, 8 pls. John Van Voorst: London
 Leche, W. 1878. Öfversigt öfver de af Svenska Expeditionerna till Novaja Semlja och Jenissej 1875 och 1876 Insamlade: Hafs-Mollusker. Kongliga Svenska Vetenskaps-Akademiens Handlingar (2)16(2): 1–86, pls. 1–2
 Smith, E. A. 1899. On some Mollusca from Bering Sea, with descriptions of two new species of Trochidae. Proceedings of the Malacological Society of London 3: 205–207
 Dall, W. H. 1919. Descriptions of new species of Mollusca from the North Pacific Ocean in the collection of the United States National Museum. Proceedings of the United States National Museum 56(2295): 293–371
 Backeljau, T. (1986). Lijst van de recente mariene mollusken van België [List of the recent marine molluscs of Belgium]. Koninklijk Belgisch Instituut voor Natuurwetenschappen: Brussels, Belgium. 106 pp.
 Turgeon, D.D., et al. 1998. Common and scientific names of aquatic invertebrates of the United States and Canada. American Fisheries Society Special Publication 26 page(s): 60
 Gofas, S.; Le Renard, J.; Bouchet, P. (2001). Mollusca, in: Costello, M.J. et al. (Ed.) (2001). European register of marine species: a check-list of the marine species in Europe and a bibliography of guides to their identification. Collection Patrimoines Naturels, 50: pp. 180–213 
 Kantor Yu.I. & Sysoev A.V. (2006) Marine and brackish water Gastropoda of Russia and adjacent countries: an illustrated catalogue. Moscow: KMK Scientific Press. 372 pp. + 140 pls. page(s): 34
 Gulbin V.V. & Chaban E.M. (2012) Annotated list of shell-bearing gastropods of Commander Islands. Part I. The Bulletin of the Russian Far East Malacological Society 15–16: 5–30.
 Dyntaxa (2013) Swedish Taxonomic Database.

External links
 

helicinus
Gastropods described in 1774
Taxa named by Constantine Phipps, 2nd Baron Mulgrave